Last Mountain is a former provincial electoral district for the Legislative Assembly of the province of Saskatchewan, Canada. Centered on the town of Strasbourg, it included the northern half of Last Mountain Lake.

This constituency was created for the 2nd Saskatchewan general election in 1908. It was dissolved and combined with the Touchwood district (as Last Mountain-Touchwood) before the 18th Saskatchewan general election in 1975.

A federal electoral district in the same area existed from 1914 to 1935.

Members of the Legislative Assembly

Election results

|-

|style="width: 130px"|Provincial Rights
|Thomas Arnold Anderson
|align="right"|1,204
|align="right"|57.12%
|align="right"|–

|- bgcolor="white"
!align="left" colspan=3|Total
!align="right"|2,108
!align="right"|100.00%
!align="right"|

|-

|Conservative
|Thomas Arnold Anderson
|align="right"|793
|align="right"|35.37%
|align="right"|-21.75
|- bgcolor="white"
!align="left" colspan=3|Total
!align="right"|2,242
!align="right"|100.00%
!align="right"|

|-

|- bgcolor="white"
!align="left" colspan=3|Total
!align="right"|3,867
!align="right"|100.00%
!align="right"|

|-

|- bgcolor="white"
!align="left" colspan=3|Total
!align="right"|Acclamation
!align="right"|

|-

|- bgcolor="white"
!align="left" colspan=3|Total
!align="right"|Acclamation
!align="right"|

|-

|Conservative
|Gustavus Mackay
|align="right"|2,043
|align="right"|44.94%
|align="right"|-
|- bgcolor="white"
!align="left" colspan=3|Total
!align="right"|4,546
!align="right"|100.00%
!align="right"|

|-

|- bgcolor="white"
!align="left" colspan=3|Total
!align="right"|6,019
!align="right"|100.00%
!align="right"|

|-

|Farmer-Labour
|Jacob Benson
|align="right"|2,709
|align="right"|39.96%
|align="right"|-18.54

|Conservative
|Allan A. Peters
|align="right"|1,338
|align="right"|19.74%
|align="right"|-
|- bgcolor="white"
!align="left" colspan=3|Total
!align="right"|6,779
!align="right"|100.00%
!align="right"|

|-

|style="width: 130px"|CCF
|Jacob Benson
|align="right"|3,299
|align="right"|38.86%
|align="right"|-1.10

|Conservative
|Alfred J. Dyer
|align="right"|1,121
|align="right"|13.20%
|align="right"|-6.54

|- bgcolor="white"
!align="left" colspan=3|Total
!align="right"|8,490
!align="right"|100.00%
!align="right"|

|-

|style="width: 130px"|CCF
|Jacob Benson
|align="right"|3,803
|align="right"|53.20%
|align="right"|+14.34

|Prog. Conservative
|James L. Blair
|align="right"|1,281
|align="right"|17.92%
|align="right"|+4.72
|- bgcolor="white"
!align="left" colspan=3|Total
!align="right"|7,148
!align="right"|100.00%
!align="right"|

|-

|style="width: 130px"|CCF
|Jacob Benson
|align="right"|3,755
|align="right"|47.09%
|align="right"|-6.11

|- bgcolor="white"
!align="left" colspan=3|Total
!align="right"|7,975
!align="right"|100.00%
!align="right"|

|-

|style="width: 130px"|CCF
|Russell Brown
|align="right"|3,483
|align="right"|44.90%
|align="right"|-2.19

|Independent
|Jacob Benson
|align="right"|1,087
|align="right"|14.01%
|align="right"|–

|- bgcolor="white"
!align="left" colspan=3|Total
!align="right"|7,757
!align="right"|100.00%
!align="right"|

|-

|style="width: 130px"|CCF
|Russell Brown
|align="right"|2,911
|align="right"|38.62%
|align="right"|-6.28

|- bgcolor="white"
!align="left" colspan=3|Total
!align="right"|7,538
!align="right"|100.00%
!align="right"|

|-

|style="width: 130px"|CCF
|Russell Brown
|align="right"|2,566
|align="right"|34.89%
|align="right"|-3.73

|Prog. Conservative
|Charles A. Nichol
|align="right"|753
|align="right"|10.24%
|align="right"|-
|- bgcolor="white"
!align="left" colspan=3|Total
!align="right"|7,354
!align="right"|100.00%
!align="right"|

|-

|CCF
|Russell Brown
|align="right"|2,799
|align="right"|39.77%
|align="right"|+4.88

|- bgcolor="white"
!align="left" colspan=3|Total
!align="right"|7,038
!align="right"|100.00%
!align="right"|

|-

|NDP
|Gordon MacMurchy
|align="right"|2,399
|align="right"|41.23%
|align="right"|+1.46

|Prog. Conservative
|George Richardson
|align="right"|995
|align="right"|17.10%
|align="right"|-
|- bgcolor="white"
!align="left" colspan=3|Total
!align="right"|5,819
!align="right"|100.00%
!align="right"|

|-

|style="width: 130px"|NDP
|Gordon MacMurchy
|align="right"|2,646
|align="right"|51.95%
|align="right"|+10.72

|- bgcolor="white"
!align="left" colspan=3|Total
!align="right"|5,093
!align="right"|100.00%
!align="right"|

See also 
Electoral district (Canada)
List of Saskatchewan provincial electoral districts
List of Saskatchewan general elections
List of political parties in Saskatchewan
Last Mountain Lake
Strasbourg, Saskatchewan

References

 Saskatchewan Archives Board – Saskatchewan Election Results By Electoral Division

Former provincial electoral districts of Saskatchewan
Last Mountain Valley No. 250, Saskatchewan